Lozotaenia forsterana is a moth of the family Tortricidae. It is found in Europe and across the Palearctic.

The wingspan is 20–29 mm. The forewings are narrowed anteriorly and pale brownish, darker-strigulated. The central fascia is represented by a dark fuscous costal spot, and there is an ill-defined praetornal suffusion. The costal patch is dark fuscous. The hindwings are grey. The larva is pale grey -green or grey, sides sometimes whitish; head black; plate of 2 yellow-brown, with two black spots.

The moth flies from June to August.

The larvae feed on various plants, but prefer Hedera helix.

References

External links
 Lozotaenia forsterana at UK Moths

Moths described in 1781
Moths of Japan
Tortricidae of Europe
Archipini